Colette Nic Aodha (born 1967) is an Irish poet and writer.

Biography
Colette Nic Aodha was born in Shrule, Co. Mayo. She attended University College Galway where she completed a BA in Irish and History in 1988. She later went on to get an MA in Irish and is completing a PhD. She also gained a teaching qualification and spent several years as a secondary school teacher in Dublin and Carlow as well as in her own school in Galway. Nic Aodha has also taught in the Department of Irish Studies in Galway where she now lives and writes in both English and Irish. Most of her work is Irish language poetry although she has at least one collection of poetry in English and several in both. She has also completed an academic review of the blind poet Antoine Ó Raifteiri. Her work is used on the syllabus for primary, secondary and third level students.

Nic Aodha is on the Board of directors for Poetry Ireland and works on IMRAM, the Irish Language Festival. Her work has been in multiple anthologies.

Bibliography
 Baill seirce, 1998
 Faoi chrann cnó capaill, 2000 
 Gallúnach-ar-rópa, 2003 
 Ádh mór, 2004 
 Sundial, 2005 
 Between curses = Bainne géar, 2007 
   Ainteafan, Coiscéim, 2008
 Scéal ón oirthear, 2009 
 Raiftearaí i gceartlár a dhaoine san aonú haois is fiche, 2009 
 Áilíos, 2010
 In castlewood : an ghaoth aduaidh, 2012 
 Oíche Nollag na mBan sa bhFásach, 2014 
 Bainne Gear : Sour Milk, 2016
  Réabhlóideach, 2020, Coiscéim

References and sources

1967 births
Living people
Irish women poets
Alumni of the University of Galway
Irish-language writers
20th-century Irish poets
20th-century Irish women writers
21st-century Irish poets
21st-century Irish women writers
People from County Mayo